The York and North Midland Railway (Y&NMR) was an English railway company that opened in 1839 connecting York with the Leeds and Selby Railway, and in 1840 extended this line to meet the North Midland Railway at Normanton near Leeds. Its first chairman was the railway financier George Hudson, who had been called the railway king.

The railway expanded, by building new lines or buying or leasing already built ones, to serve Hull, Scarborough, Whitby, Market Weighton and Harrogate. In 1849 Hudson resigned as chairman as an investigation found financial irregularities in his running of the company. The results of a price war in the early 1850s led to amalgamation and on 31 July 1854 the Y&NMR merged with the Leeds Northern Railway and the York, Newcastle & Berwick Railway to form the North Eastern Railway.

Origins 

Having seen the success of the Liverpool and Manchester Railway and, in 1833, Acts of Parliament for lines to London from Lancashire – the Grand Junction and the London and Birmingham, the manufacturers of Yorkshire realised that they would be at a commercial disadvantage.

George Hudson, who was brought up in a farming community and started life as a draper's assistant in York until in 1827, when he was 27 years old, he inherited £30,000. He had no former interest in railways, but seeing them as a profitable investment arranged a public meeting in 1833 to discuss building a line from York to Leeds. While the route was being planned, the North Midland Railway was formed in 1835 to build a line from Derby to Leeds. This would connect with the Midland Counties Railway at Derby and therefore, via the London & Birmingham Railway, provide rail access to London. Later that year at a public meeting in York, the York & North Midlands Railway was formed to build a railway line to a junction with the North Midland Railway near Normanton.

George Stephenson was appointed engineer for the line, a private bill was presented to Parliament seeking permission to build the railway and Royal Assent was given on 21 June 1836 to the Act that confirmed Hudson as chairman.

The line to Burton Salmon was open on 11 May 1840 and the final section, with the junction at Altofts with the North Midland, opened at the end of June. After 1 July 1840 it was possible to travel to London in 14 hours  by a service that left York at 7:30 am. The route taken by the line had required little in the way of earthworks, apart from a cutting at Fairburn, and gave a maximum gradient of 1 in 484 with broad curves. There were 31 bridges, the principal ones being over the Rivers Aire, Wharfe and Calder. These were of stone, with those over the Calder and at Holdgate Lane built on the skew. The joint station with the Great North of England Railway, was within the city walls at York, and piercing of the walls was required to preserve the upper walkway; designs by G.T. Andrews and by Thomas Cabry (Y&NM engineer) were submitted to the Yorkshire Philosophical Society who chose Andrews' tudor arches. The track was of straight sided pattern at  lb per yard supported either on stone blocks or kyanised wooden sleepers. Locomotives were supplied by Robert Stephenson and Company and the first class carriages were lit with lamps at night, the second class were open at the sides, and in third class passengers seat on longitudinal benches without cover.

Expansion 
The Leeds & Hull Railroad Company had been formed in 1824 to build a railway from Leeds to the port of Hull, but had failed to raise the necessary funds. The Leeds & Selby Railway (L&SR) was formed in 1829 to build a railway as far as Selby, where goods could be conveyed onwards on barges on the Ouse and Humber to Hull. A service started in September 1834 from a station in Leeds at Marsh Lane, just to the west of a  tunnel through Richmond Hill, and Hull could be reached in about  hours. The Hull & Selby Railway received permission in June 1836 to complete the line to Hull, and the  line, which crossed the Ouse at Selby with a bascule bridge, opened  on 1 July 1840.

On 27 July 1840 a curve opened connecting the North Midland Railway at Methley Junction and allowing the Y&NMR direct access to Leeds, in competition with the L&SR. From 9 November Hudson leased the line for £17,000 per year; from then all traffic between Leeds and Selby was diverted via Methley and over the North Midland Railway to its Wellington station. However, the management of the Hull & Selby refused any offers from Hudson to lease or operate over their line and in 1844 formed an alliance with the Manchester & Leeds Railway, which was planning a route to Selby. Amalgamation was proposed early in 1845, but at two meetings shareholders overruled the directors, accepting instead a lease from Hudson at ten per cent of the original capital, with an option to purchase, and the H&SR became part of the Y&NMR from 1 July 1845.

A railway to the port of Whitby was proposed in 1826, George Stephenson recommended a route to Pickering in 1832 and the Whitby and Pickering Railway Act received Royal Assent on 6 May 1833, which both permitted and prohibited steam locomotives. The River Esk was diverted a mile from Whitby but a number of bridges were needed, including a  five span timber bridge at Ruswarp. A  tunnel was dug at Grosmont and at Beck Hole a  inclined plane was built at a gradient of 1 in 15. The line, worked by horses, opened to Grosmont on 8 June 1835 and to Pickering on 26 May 1836. At Beck Hole carriages were worked up or down the incline individually; each summer the landlord of a nearby inn erected a tent so as to supply refreshments to waiting passengers. The journey from Pickering to Whitby took an average  hours.

The  line and  branch were built in less than a year and opened on 7 July 1845. Following celebrations on the opening day, the railway offered free travel for the first five days. The line to Whitby was doubled, timber bridges replaced with ones built from iron and the tunnel at Grosmont rebuilt, although the incline at Beck Hole was not replaced until 1864. The first train hauled by a steam locomotive ran on 4 June 1847.

The Leeds & Thirsk was able to offer a shorter journey to Leeds after it had opened to Leeds in July 1849, although the Y&NMR station at Brunswick was more convenient. The line was built and opened on 6 October 1846 as the Hull & Scarborough branch. Parliamentary approval for two lines to Market Weighton was granted to the York and North Midland Railway on 18 June 1846. A double line York to Beverley Line was opened to Market Weighton on 4 October 1847, and a single line from Selby to Market Weighton opened on 1 August 1848.

George Hudson departs 

During the railway mania of the mid 1840s many people invested in railway companies, believing it a means of quickly getting rich. By the mid 1840s Hudson was also chairman of the Midland, Newcastle & Berwick and Newcastle & Darlington Junction Railways. Called the "railway king" by the preacher Sydney Smith, he was said to have the favour of Albert, the Prince Consort. So as to better promote the bills submitted by the railway companies he controlled, in 1845 Hudson successfully stood as a Conservative Member of Parliament for Sunderland. Hudson and Edmund Denison, the chairman of the GNR, met at the end of 1848 and agreed terms for the GNR to access York via Knottingley, the GNR dropping plans for its own line to York via . In response the YN&BR and Y&NMR co-operated to lower prices to keep the traffic flowing via York.

At the end of 1848 the dividend paid by the Y&NMR dropped from ten per cent to six per cent and at a  subsequent half-yearly YN&BR shareholders meeting the very high cost of certain Great North shares bought during the merger was questioned. After Hudson admitted the company had purchased them from him,  an investigating committee was set up and Hudson resigned as chairman in May 1849. The committee reported on a number of irregularities in the account such as inflating traffic figures and finding capital items that had been charged to the revenue account, thus paying dividends out of capital. No dividend was paid for the first half year of 1849, and Hudson was to pay £212,000 settling claims over share transactions.

The building of new branches was severely restricted in the years following Hudson's departure. Work was halted on a direct line between York and Leeds, the York and North Midland Railway (Leeds Extension) branch, although a stone viaduct had been built across the River Wharfe at Tadcaster (see Tadcaster Viaduct), and an extension of the line from York to Market Weighton onto Beverley was suspended. However, the independent East & West Yorkshire Junction Railway had been authorised on 16 July 1846 to build a railway from the main line just outside York to Knaresborough. When it opened to a temporary station at Hay Park Lane on 30 October 1848, the line was worked by the York, Newcastle & Berwick Railway, but after 1849 this was switched to E. B. Wilson and Company, who was paid per mile plus a percentage of revenue. The railway was taken over by the York & North Midland on 1 July 1851.

Locomotives

For locomotives taken over from the Hull and Selby Railway see Hull and Selby Railway.
Notes
 YNMR = York and North Midland Railway
 NER = North Eastern Railway

Accidents and incidents 
 On 11 November 1840, a luggage train was in a rear-end collision with a passenger train at Taylor's Junction, Yorkshire. Two people were killed. The line was being worked under time interval working.
 In 1850, the boiler of a locomotive exploded whilst it was hauling a freight train at Staddlethorpe station, Yorkshire, derailing the locomotive.

North Eastern Railway 

T.E. Harrison, who had become General Manager and Engineer of the YN&BR, looked at merger with LNR and Y&NMR as the answer. Negotiations started first with his own board, where he was able to show the increased profit that amalgamation had brought to the YN&BR. With a proposal that the shares of the three companies remain separate, replaced by Berwick Capital Stock, York Capital Stock and Leeds Capital Stock, and dividends paid from pooled revenue, the agreement of the three boards was reached in November 1852. The deal was rejected by the shareholders of the Leeds Northern, who felt their seven per cent share of revenue too low; joint operation was agreed instead of a full merger and Harrison appointed General Manager.

The former Leeds Northern and York & North Midland lines in Harrogate were connected, the permission being given by an Act on 8 August 1859. The station at Brunswick was replaced by the current Harrogate railway station on a new line that branched from the Y&NMR line in town to the former Leeds Northern line north of Starbeck. Another new line, connecting from north of Pannal station to end of Crimple Viaduct, gave the former Leeds Northern line access to this station.

In 1863 the North Eastern Railway applied for permission for a line from Church Fenton to Micklefield and a new station near the Midland Railway at Leeds, and these opened on 1 April 1869, and a through passenger service ran on a section of former Leeds & Selby line for the first time since Hudson had diverted the York to Leeds trains in 1840. In 1864 the NER applied for permission for a new line south from York to Doncaster via Selby. Royal Assent was given that year, and modifications were given permission the following year. The old station at York was replaced by a through station outside the city walls in 1877. The York to Market Weighton line was extended to Hull via Beverley, opening on 1 May 1865. The line from Selby through Market Weighton to Driffield was when the Scarborough Bridlington & West Riding Junction Railway was given permission to build a railway on 6 August 1885. From 18 April 1890 the NER provided freight services and from 1 May 1890 also carried passengers; the NER took over the line in 1913. The NER inherited the perpetual lease on the Hull & Selby Railway, purchasing it on 1 March 1872.

As a result of the Railways Act 1921, on 1 January 1923 the North Eastern Railway became part of the London and North Eastern Railway (LNER). Britain's railways were nationalised on 1 January 1948 and the former York & North Midland lines were placed under the control of British Railways.

Legacy 

The line between Milford Junction and Altofts Junction is used by freight services only. The former Leeds & Selby and Selby & Hull lines are open and used by trains from Hull to Leeds and York.

In 1963 Dr Beeching published his report "The Reshaping of British Railways", which recommended closing the network's least used stations and lines. This listed the former Y&NMR lines from Church Fenton to Harrogate  and the former Whitby & Pickering Railway. The two lines through Market Weighton were listed for closure, both having been extended by the NER, the line from York to Hull via Beverley the one from Selby to Driffield.

The former Y&NMR line between Church Fenton and Harrogate closed to passengers on 6 January 1964. Today's Harrogate Line follows the former Leeds & Thirsk line from Leeds to join the former Y&NMR line over the Crimple Viaduct. Services pass over the link between the 1882 Harrogate station and Starbeck station before taking the branch to Knaresborough and the E&WJR to York. The York to Scarborough line and the coast line from Hull to Seamer remain open. The branch to Whitby closed to Grosmont in 1965, the line through the Esk Valley to Middlesbrough remaining open. The line from Grosmont to Pickering has since reopened as part of the heritage North Yorkshire Moors Railway.

The lines through Market Weighton closed in 1965, the line between York and Beverley on 29 November.

In January 2019, Campaign for Better Transport released a report identifying the line between Pickering and Malton which was listed as Priority 2 for reopening. Priority 2 is for those lines which require further development or a change in circumstances (such as housing developments).

Notes and references

Notes

References

Sources 
 
 
  See also

External links 

 
Early British railway companies
Railway companies established in 1836
Railway lines opened in 1839
Railway companies disestablished in 1854
1836 establishments in England
Standard gauge railways in England
1854 disestablishments in England